The Lost Books of the Bible and the Forgotten Books of Eden (1926) is a collection of 17th-century and 18th-century English translations of some Old Testament Pseudepigrapha and New Testament apocrypha, some of which were assembled in the 1820s, and then republished with the current title in 1926.

History of the translations
Rutherford Hayes Platt, in the preface to his 1964 reprint of The Lost Books of the Bible and the Forgotten Books of Eden states:
"First issued in 1926, this is the most popular collection of apocryphal and pseudepigraphal literature ever published."
The translations were first published, under this title, by an unknown editor in The Lost Books of the Bible Cleveland 1926, but the translations had previously been published many times. 

The book is, essentially, a combined reprint of earlier works.  The first half, Lost Books of the Bible, is an unimproved reprint of a book published by William Hone in 1820, titled The Apocryphal New Testament, itself a reprint of a translation of the Apostolic Fathers done in 1693 by William Wake, who later became the Archbishop of Canterbury, and a smattering of medieval embellishments on the New Testament, from a book  by Jeremiah Jones (1693–1724), posthumously published in 1736. In the three centuries since these were originally published, a great deal more is known about the Apostolic Fathers (including a good deal of the original text that was not available in 1693) and New Testament apocrypha.

The second half of the book, The Forgotten Books of Eden, includes a translation originally published in 1882 of the "First and Second Books of Adam and Eve", translated first from ancient Ethiopic to German by Ernest Trumpp and then into English by Solomon Caesar Malan, and a number of items of Old Testament pseudepigrapha, such as reprinted in the second volume of R.H. Charles's Apocrypha and Pseudepigrapha of the Old Testament (Oxford, 1913).

More modern translations of these works include J. H. Charlesworth, ed. Old Testament Pseudepigrapha; W. Schneemelcher, ed. New Testament Apocrypha; and M. R. James,  The Apocryphal New Testament.

Past of The Lost Books of the Bible
♦ = attributed to the Apostolic Fathers
 The Book of Enoch
 The Protevangelion
 The Gospel of the Infancy of Jesus Christ
 The Infancy Gospel of Thomas
 The Epistles of Jesus Christ and Abgarus King of Edessa
 The Gospel of Nicodemus (Acts of Pilate)
 The Apostles' Creed (throughout history)
 The Epistle of Paul the Apostle to the Laodiceans
 The Epistles of Paul the Apostle to Seneca, with Seneca's to Paul
 The Acts of Paul and Thecla
♦ The Epistles of Clement (The First and Second Epistles of Clement to the Corinthians)
♦ The Epistle of Barnabas
♦ The Epistle of Ignatius to the Ephesians
♦ The Epistle of Ignatius to the Magnesians
♦ The Epistle of Ignatius to the Trallians
♦ The Epistle of Ignatius to the Romans
♦ The Epistle of Ignatius to the Philadelphians
♦ The Epistle of Ignatius to the Smyrneans
♦ The Epistle of Ignatius to Polycarp
♦ The Shepherd of Hermas (Visions, Commands, and Similitudes)
 Letter of Herod To Pilate the Governor
 Letter of Pilate to Herod
 The Lost Gospel of Peter
♦ The Epistle of Polycarp to the Philippians

Contents of The Forgotten Books of Eden
 The Conflict of Adam and Eve with Satan (The First and Second Book of Adam and Eve)
 The Secrets of Enoch  (also known as the Slavonic Enoch or Second Enoch)
 The Psalms of Solomon
 The Odes of Solomon
 The Letter of Aristeas
 The Fourth Book of Maccabees
 The Story of Ahikar
 Testaments of the Twelve Patriarchs

1. Books of the Apocrypha:

First and Second Esdras (150-100 BC)

Tobit (200 BC)

Judith (150 BC)

Additions to Esther (140-130 BC)

Wisdom of Solomon (30 BC)

Ecclesiasticus, otherwise known as The Wisdom of Jesus son of Sirach (132 BC)

Baruch (150-50 BC)

Letter of Jeremiah (300-100 BC)

Song of the Three Holy Children, an addition in the Greek version of Daniel 3 (170-160 BC)

Susanna (200-0 BC)

Bel and the Dragon (100 BC)

Additions to Daniel, or the Prayer of Azariah (200-0 BC)

Prayer of Manasseh (100-0 BC)

First Maccabees (110 BC)

Second Maccabees (110-170 BC)

2. Books of the Pseudepigrapha:

Epistle of Barnabas

First (and Second) Epistle of Clement to the Corinthians

The letter of the Smyrnaeans (also known as The Martyrdom of Polycarp)

The Shepherd of Hermas

The Book of Enoch

The Gospel of Judas (130-170 AD)

The Gospel of Thomas (140-170 AD)

The Psalms of Solomon

The Odes of Solomon

The Testaments of the Twelve Patriarchs

Second Baruch

The Books of Adam and Eve

The Acts of Phillip

The Apocalypse of Peter

The Gospel of the Nativity of Mary

The Gospel of Nicodemus

The Gospel of the Saviour's Infancy

The History of Joseph the Carpenter

The Acts of Paul (Including Paul and Thecla)

The Seven Epistles of Ignatius

The Epistle of Polycarp to the Philippians

References
Edgar J. Goodspeed, Modern Apocrypha (Boston, Beacon Press, 1956), chapt. 15.

External links
}

1926 non-fiction books
17th-century Christian texts
18th-century Christian texts
Ancient Christianity
Ancient Christian controversies
Apocrypha
Books about the Bible
Books about Christianity
Christian Greek pseudepigrapha
Christianity in late antiquity
Early Christianity
Old Testament apocrypha
Old Testament pseudepigrapha
Works of uncertain authorship
1st-century Christianity